A triad, in a religious context, refers to a grouping of three gods, usually by importance or similar roles. A triad of gods were usually not considered to be one in the same being, or different aspects of a single deity as in a Trinity or Triple deity.

Triads of three closely associated deities were commonly found throughout the ancient world, and in particular in the religious traditions of Ancient Greece and Egypt.

List of deity triads

Historical polytheism
 The Classical Greek Olympic triad of Zeus (king of the gods), Athena (goddess of war and intellect) and Apollo (god of the sun, culture and music)
 The Delian chief triad of Leto (mother), Artemis (daughter) and Apollo (son) and second Delian triad of Athena, Zeus and Hera
 The Eleusinian Mysteries centered on Persephone (daughter), Demeter (mother), and Triptolemus (to whom Demeter taught agriculture)
 In ancient Egypt there were many triads:
 the Osirian (or Abydos) triad of Osiris (husband), Isis (wife), and Horus (son),
 the Theban triad of Amun, Mut and Khonsu
 the Memphite triad of Ptah, Sekhmet and Nefertem
 the Elephantine triad of Khnum (god of the source of the Nile river), Satet (the personification of the floods of the Nile river), and Anuket (the Goddess of the nile river).
 the sungod Ra, whose form in the morning was Khepri, at noon Re-Horakhty and in the evening Atum, and many others.
 The Hellenistic Egypt triad of Isis, Alexandrian Serapis and Harpocrates (a Hellenized version of the already referred Isis-Osiris-Horus triad), though in the early Ptolemaic period Serapis, Isis and Apollo (who was sometimes identified with Horus) were preferred.
 The Roman Capitoline Triad of Jupiter (father), Juno (wife), and Minerva (daughter)
 The Roman pleibian triad of Ceres, Liber Pater and Libera (or its Greek counterpart with Demeter, Dionysos and Kore)
 The Julian triads of the early Roman Principate:
 Venus Genetrix, Divus Iulius, and Clementia Caesaris
 Divus Iulius, Divi filius and Genius Augusti
 Eastern variants of the Julian triad, e.g. in Asia Minor: Dea Roma, Divus Iulius and Genius Augusti (or Divi filius)
 The Matres (Deae Matres/Dea Matrona) in Roman mythology
 The Fates, Moirai or Furies in Greek and Roman mythology: Clotho or Nona the Spinner, Lachesis or Decima the Weaver, and Atropos or Morta the Cutter of the Threads of Life. One's Lifeline was Spun by Clotho, Woven into the tapestry of Life by Lachesis, and the thread Cut by Atropos.
 The Hooded Spirits or Genii Cucullati in Gallo-Roman times
 The main supranational triad of the ancient Lusitanian mythology and religion and Portuguese Neopagans made up of the couple Arentia and Arentius and Quangeius and Trebaruna, followed by a minor Gallaecian-Lusitanian triad of Bandua (under many natures), Nabia and Reve female nature: Reva
 The sisters Uksáhkká, Juksáhkká and Sáhráhkká in Sámi mythology.
 The triad of Al-Lat, Al-Uzza, and Manat in the time of Mohammed (Holy Qu'ran (Abdullah Yusuf Ali translation), Surah 53:19-22)
 Lugus (Esus, Toutatis and Taranis) in Celtic mythology
 Odin, Vili and Ve in Norse mythology
 The Norns in Norse mythology
 Odin, Freyr, and Thor in Norse mythology. Odin is the god of wisdom and knowledge, Freyr is the god of fertility and prosperity, and Thor is the god of thunder and strength. 
 The Triglav in Slavic mythology
 Perkūnas (god of heaven), Patrimpas (god of earth) and Pikuolis (god of death) in Prussian mythology
 The Zorya or Auroras in Slavic mythology
 The Charites or Graces in Greek mythology
 The One, the Thought (or Intellect) and the Soul in Neoplatonism
 Trinitarian Doctrines of God the Father, God the Son, and Holy Spirit in Christianity New Testament

Christian Trinity
The Christian doctrine of the Trinity (from  "threefold") defines God as being one god existing in three coequal, coeternal, consubstantial persons: God the Father, God the Son (Jesus Christ) and God the Holy Spirit — three distinct persons sharing one essence. In this context, the three persons define  God is, while the one essence defines  God is. This doctrine is called Trinitarianism and its adherents are called trinitarians, while its opponents are called antitrinitarians or nontrinitarians. Nontrinitarian positions include Unitarianism, Binitarianism and Modalism.

Dharmic religions

 Amitabha Triad - Amitābha, Avalokiteśvara and Mahāsthāmaprāpta in Mahayana Buddhism
 Ayyavazhi Trinity
 Brahma, Vishnu, and Shiva (Trimurti) in Puranic Hinduism
 Lord Dattatreya
 Mitra, Aryaman, and Varuna in early vedic Hinduism
 Ganga, Yamuna, and Saraswati merged in one is the Triveni
 Sahā Triad - Shakyamuni, Avalokitesvara and Ksitigarbha in Mahayana Buddhism
 Shakti, Lakshmi, and Saraswati (Tridevi) in Puranic Hinduism

Other Eastern religions
 Three Pure Ones in Taoism
 Fu Lu Shou in Taoism
 San-shan kuo-wang, Lords of the Three Mountains in Chinese folk religion
 The Ahuric Triad of Ahura Mazda, Mithra and Apam Napat in Zoroastrianism. Also, in Achaemenid times, Mazda, Mithra and Anahita.
 Amaterasu, Tsukuyomi and Susanoo in Shinto.
 Tản Viên Sơn Thánh, Thần Cao Sơn and Thần Quý Minh, Three mountain gods rule the Ba Vì mountain range in Vietnamese folk religion.
 Mẫu Thượng Thiên, Mẫu Thoải and Mẫu Thượng Ngàn in Đạo Mẫu.

Esotericism
 Nuit, Hadit and Ra Hoor Khuit in the Thelemic spiritual system

See also
 List of deities
 Les Lavandières
 Mythography
 Thraetaona
 Three hares
 Trichotomy (philosophy)
 Trifunctional hypothesis
 Trita
 Tritheism

References

3 (number)
Lists of deities
Mythological archetypes